Rolf Ziegler (born 17 January 1951 in Stuttgart) is a former athlete who specialized in the 400 metres hurdles. He represented West Germany at the 1972 Munich Olympics and the World University Games, winning in 1975 and coming third in 1977. He competed for the club SKV Egolsheim.

Biography
He won the silver medal in 4 x 400 metres relay at the 1974 European Championships together with teammates Hermann Köhler, Horst-Rüdiger Schlöske and Karl Honz. Ziegler also competed in the individual 400 metres hurdles contest and finished eighth.

References

1951 births
Living people
West German male hurdlers
West German male sprinters
Athletes (track and field) at the 1972 Summer Olympics
Olympic athletes of West Germany
European Athletics Championships medalists
Universiade medalists in athletics (track and field)
Universiade gold medalists for West Germany
Universiade bronze medalists for West Germany
Sportspeople from Stuttgart